James Reed Holton (1938–2004) was a professor of atmospheric sciences at the University of Washington. He was a specialist on atmospheric dynamics, and the author of the atmospheric science textbook An Introduction to Dynamic Meteorology.

He was at the University of Washington for 38 years, and awarded every major award in the atmospheric sciences. He was also a member of the National Academy of Sciences. The American Geophysical Union has now named an award after him, named the James R. Holton award ).

References

External links
 Homepage
 Obituary
 John M. Wallace, "James R. Holton", Biographical Memoirs of the National Academy of Sciences (2014)

1938 births
2004 deaths
University of Washington faculty
Members of the United States National Academy of Sciences
American meteorologists
Carl-Gustaf Rossby Research Medal recipients